The following highways are numbered 744:

Costa Rica
 National Route 744

India
 National Highway 744 (India)

United States